The original 7 World Trade Center (7 WTC) was a 47-story building, designed by Emery Roth & Sons, with a red granite facade. Tishman Realty & Construction managed construction of the building. The ground-breaking ceremony was hosted on October 2, 1984. The building opened in May 1987, becoming the seventh structure of the World Trade Center. It was destroyed in 2001 during the September 11 attacks, due to uncontrolled fires causing structural failure.

An elevated walkway spanning Vesey Street connected the building to the World Trade Center plaza. The building was situated above a Consolidated Edison power substation, which imposed unique structural design constraints. When the building opened in 1987, Silverstein had difficulties attracting tenants.

On September 11, 2001, the structure was substantially damaged by debris when the nearby North Tower of the World Trade Center collapsed. The debris ignited fires on multiple lower floors of the building, which continued to burn uncontrolled throughout the afternoon. The building's internal fire suppression system lacked water pressure to fight the fires. The collapse began when a critical internal column buckled and triggered cascading failure of nearby columns throughout, which was first visible from the exterior with the crumbling of a rooftop penthouse structure at 5:20:33 pm. The collapse made 7 World Trade Center the first steel skyscraper known to have collapsed primarily due to uncontrolled fires.

Construction of a new 7 World Trade Center was started in 2002 and completed in 2006.

Tenants 
According to CoStar Group, floors 9 and 10 of 7 WTC were occupied by the U.S. Secret Service. The CIA had offices on the 25th floor of 7 WTC, as reported by the Associated Press. The National Institute of Standards and Technology's 2008 Final Report on the Collapse of World Trade Center Building 7 confirmed that floor 14 was vacant, and updated the news reports of CoStar and Associated Press from 2001 to show that Salomon Smith Barney leased floors 15 to 17.

Totals

Sources:

References 

Lists of companies based in New York (state)
World Trade Center
Manhattan-related lists
Seven